John Lyon, 5th Earl of Strathmore and Kinghorne (1696 – 13 November 1715) was a Scottish peer and nobleman. He was the son of John Lyon, 4th Earl of Strathmore and Kinghorne. He died fighting with the Jacobites in The Battle of Sheriffmuir in 1715.

Ancestry

1696 births
1715 deaths
5
People of the Jacobite rising of 1715
John